The Queens Historical Society, which was founded in 1968 after a merger with the Kingsland Preservation Commission, is dedicated to preserving the history and heritage of Queens, New York and interpreting the history of the borough as it relates to various historical periods. The historical society is the only museum about Queens' history within the borough and is located in Kingsland Homestead, which is a historic house museum within Weeping Beech Park.

Among the historical society's main projects is assisting in the preservation and designation of the borough's landmarks, the preservation of the Brinckerhoff Family Cemetery, as well as several other cemeteries in the borough.

References

External links
Queens Historical Society

Museums in Queens, New York
History museums in New York City
History of Queens, New York
Historical society museums in New York City
Historical societies in New York City
1968 establishments in New York City